This is a list of the current members of the sixth Western Cape Provincial Parliament.

See also
List of members of the 5th Western Cape Provincial Parliament

References 

List of Members